Mahabad Qaradaghi or Mehabad Qeredaxî (1966 – 9 October 2020) was a Kurdish activist, writer, poet and translator. She was born in Kifri, a town near Kirkuk. Her first collections of poems were published in 1980, and she was imprisoned by the Ba'athist regime from 1980 to 1981. In 1993, she emigrated to Sweden. She was the adviser of Prime Minister in Women's Issues, in the Kurdistan Regional Government (KRG), in Arbil, Iraqi Kurdistan.

Works
Panorama: Poem., 206 pp., Skinnskatteberg, 1993. .
Shakh kelga-y qanmashami ya : Poem, 90 pp., Skinnskatteberg, 1994. .
Koç : novel, 163 pp., Skinnskatteberg, 1994. .
To Revive Women ( Le Pênawî Jîyanewey Afiret da), 174 pp., Newroz Publishers,  Stockholm, 1995.
Dan Piyananêkî Piyawane, translation of a novel by Nawal As-Sadawi, 175 pp.,  Skinnskatteberg, 1994.  .
Şê'r Henasey Gerdûne : Translation of contemporary poems of women, 94 pp., Falköping, 1994.  .
Poetry is the breath of the universe : worlds poetry, translated by Mahabad Qaradaghi, 95 pp.,  .
Germiyan, with Fahmi Kakaee and Amjad Shakely, 155 pp., Falköping, 2000, .
Bawegurgur, with  Fahmi Kakaee and Amjad Shakely, 201 pp., Falköping, 2001, .
Azadkirdinî Mêjû: Lêkolînewe le ser kêşey jinan, 203 pp., Sardam Publishers, Sulaimaniya, 2002.
Mergî mirov û nîwêk : Collection of short stories, 232 pp., Aras Publishers, Arbil, 2004.
Şerefname : "şeref" kodêke bo koylekirdinî jin : pênasekirdinewey çemkî şeref û cestey jin, women's issues, Kitêbî Herzan Publishers, 2004. .
Nexşey diwarojî kirêkar, Poem.
Saxêlkey genmesamiye, Poem.
Mîdalya, Poem.
Hajey roh, Poem.
Snöfåglar, Poem. (in Swedish)
Fentazya, Novel.
Azadkirdinî mêjû, Analysis.
Ziman, raman û nasname, Analysis.
Jin û komelge le qonaxî balindeyî Şêrko Bêkes da, (Woman and society in the poems of Sherko Bekas).
Nanî jehrawî, Translation of a Play by  Vesselin Hanchev.
A year in hell (Memoir)

References

External Links 
Mahabad Qaradaghi from Immigrant Institutet (in Swedish)
Some articles written by Mahabad Qaradaghi (in Kurdish)

1966 births
2020 deaths
Iraqi emigrants to Sweden
Kurdish-language writers
Kurdish people